Celebrate Israel Parade (originally Youth Salute to Israel Parade then Salute to Israel Parade) is an annual parade in support of Israel that takes place along Fifth Avenue in New York. The parade travels north on Fifth Avenue from 57th Street to 74th Street.
 
According to the organizers of the parade, it is the largest gathering in the world in support of Israel. It has been held annually in New York City since 1964. 

Contingents of marchers come from the New York metropolitan area as well as from other parts of the country Jewish day schools, Synagogues, Youth Groups, Hillels and other organizations including the Chai Riders Motorcycle Club. Marchers also include prominent local politicians. On the same day as the parade, although not officially associated with it is, festivities including a concert in Central Park where kosher food is offered by local vendors. The Empire State Building lights its tower lights in a blue and white.

History
In 1964 Haim Zohar, Charles Bick, Ted Comet, Alvin Schiff, and Dan Ronen worked together in order to plan a demonstration of American Jewish solidarity with Israel. They coordinated with the Manhattan Day School to march from their school to a theater on Broadway. This March was known as the Youth Salute to Israel Parade.

In 1965 David Ben Gurion visited New York. Thousands of people stood on 5th Avenue watching Ben Gurion, in an impromptu event. This later created parade route followed in future years.

In 2011, the parade was renamed the Celebrate Israel Parade in a launch event at the Edison Ballroom in Midtown Manhattan.

2020 saw the parade go virtual.

United Kingdom parade
In July 2007 the United Kingdom-based Jewish Leadership Council, together with other UK Jewish groups announced that a UK Salute to Israel parade would be held in Central London and Manchester on June 29, 2008 as part of the celebrations of the 60th anniversary of the creation of the State of Israel.  These events attracted over 45,000 people to simultaneous street parades followed by open air rallies in Trafalgar Square London and Heaton Park Manchester.

Parade history

References

External links
Celebrate Israel Parade
UK Salute to Israel Parade 2008
The Salute to Israel Parade – Marissa Gross Jerusalem Center for Public Affairs

Recurring events established in 1964
Parades in New York City
Fifth Avenue
Jews and Judaism in Manhattan
Israeli-American culture in New York City
Israeli-American history
Middle Eastern-American culture in New York City
Zionism in the United States
Jewish American culture
June observances